The blackfin sorcerer (Nettastoma melanurum) is a species of saltwater eel in the family Nettastomatidae of the order Anguilliformes. It is found only in the Atlantic Ocean and the Mediterranean Sea.

Distribution
Blackfin sorcerer eels live in the coastal waters of the Atlantic Ocean and also in the western Mediterranean Sea. They are more concentrated in the waters surrounding the Caribbean, the Azores, the Canary Islands and the northern Mediterranean Sea. It is found from depths of 37 m down to 1647 m.

Appearance
They are similar in appearance to other members of the family Nettastomatidae, with the trademark duck-bill-shaped mouth. They are brown in color, and as the name suggests, a black dorsal fin runs from just behind the head all the way to the tail, also adults lack a pectoral fin. The mouth is black in color and is considered large relative to the body size.

Habitat and ecology
The Blackfin sorcerer is known to live in holes on the bottoms of continental slopes. Its natural predators include cod-like fish such as the European Hake, whilst its prey include small crustaceans and small fish. Its small size and location at the bottom of continental slopes make it of no danger to humans and is also of no use to fisheries due to the abundance of other eels which are easier to locate and catch.

References
 
 

blackfin sorcerer
Fish of the Atlantic Ocean
Marine fauna of West Africa
Fish of the Mediterranean Sea
Fish of the Eastern United States
blackfin sorcerer
blackfin sorcerer